Tantrum, the debut album by the band Tantrum,  was released in 1978.

Track listing
 Listen
 You Came To Me
 You Are My Everything
 Happy Yesterdays
 Kidnapped
 Flash Commander
 Night On Main Street
 Livin' My Life Without You
 Kid Brother
 No More

Musicians
Pam Bradley         - Lead & Backing Vocals
Sandy Caulfield     - Lead & Backing Vocals
Barb Erber          - Lead & Backing Vocals
Ray Sapko           - Guitar, Vocals
Phil Balsano        - Keyboards, Vocals
Bill Syniar         - Bass, Vocals
Vern Wennerstrom    - Drums, Percussion

1978 debut albums